Piffard is a census-designated place (CDP) and hamlet in the town of York, Livingston County, New York, United States. As of the 2010 census, its population was 220. The ZIP Code is 14533.

History
The name is from early settler David Piffard. Westerly, a historic home, was added to the National Register of Historic Places in 1974.

The Roman Catholic Abbey of the Genesee was founded a mile north of Piffard in 1951.

Geography
Piffard is in northwestern Livingston County, in the southeast part of the town of York. It is bordered to the west by the Hamlet of Retsof. New York State Route 63 passes through the Piffard, leading southeast  to Geneseo, the Livingston county seat, and northwest  to Batavia.

The community sits on the western edge of the valley of the Genesee River.

Demographics
(See table to the right.)

Notable people
Born in Piffard:
 Henry Granger Piffard (1842–1910), New York dermatologist and author of the first systematic treatise on dermatology in America

Notes

Census-designated places in New York (state)
Census-designated places in Livingston County, New York
Hamlets in New York (state)
Hamlets in Livingston County, New York